The Theatine Church of St. Cajetan and Adelaide (German: Theatinerkirche St. Kajetan und Adelheid) is a Catholic church in Munich, southern Germany. Built from 1663 to 1690, it was founded by Elector Ferdinand Maria and his wife, Henriette Adelaide of Savoy, as a gesture of thanks for the birth of the long-awaited heir to the Bavarian crown, Prince Max Emanuel, in 1662. Now administered by the Dominican Friars, it is also known as the Dominican Priory of St. Cajetan.

The church was built in Italian high-Baroque style, inspired by Sant'Andrea della Valle in Rome, designed by the Italian architect Agostino Barelli. His successor, Enrico Zuccalli, added two 66 meters high towers, originally not planned, and then finished the  dome in 1690. The facade in Rococo style was completed only in 1768 by François de Cuvilliés. Its Mediterranean appearance and yellow coloring became a well known symbol for the city and had much influence on Southern German Baroque architecture.

Architecture

After the crown prince and later elector Max Emanuel had been born on 11 July 1662, Agostino Barelli from Bologna received the draught order. As a construction site for church and cloister the north-east corner of the cross quarter was selected directly by the town wall and Schwabinger Gate which lies opposite to the Residence. Already on 29 April 1663 the laying of the foundation stone occurred. Barelli took as a model the mother's church of the Theatines, Sant'Andrea della Valle in Rome. During the shell works it came to violent discussions between Barelli and his site manager Antonio Spinelli, even Theatine and father confessor of Henriette which  finally led to Barelli's dismissal. Agostino Barelli still completed the shell till 1674 and then left Munich. In the same year Enrico Zuccalli took over the artistic management. Main focus of his activity was the outside creation. Zuccalli determined the form of the dome and the very unconventional towers.

At the same time he also co-operated in the decorative arrangement of the church interior decisively. Also in 1674 Giovanni Nicolò Perti and Antonio Viscardi as well as Abraham Leuthner began with the stucco works. The interior has a  rich stucco decoration, executed by Nicolò Petri (1685–1688), Wolfgang Leutner being responsible for the stucco figures. The great black pulpit is a work of Andreas Faistenberger (1686). The altars house paintings of Caspar de Crayer, Carlo Cignani, Georg Desmarées and Joachim von Sandrart. For the altar from 1722 Balthasar Ableithner created the larger-than-life statues of four evangelists, the statues of Saint Marcus and Saint John have survived the destruction of World War II.

On 11 June 1675 the church was consecrated – it was extensive at that time still in the shell state. Long discussions about the final facade creation delayed the completion; a final result was not found. Thus Zuccalli established first between 1684 and 1692 after his plans the towers, in 1688 the interior equipment was completed. From 1692 up to the completion Viscardi took over the site management. Henriette of Savoy did not experience the completion of the Theatinerkirche, as she died in 1676.

The outside facade of the Theatinerkirche still remained furthermore incomplete, because in spite of long discussions no arrangement could be achieved. Only about 100 years after the inauguration in 1765  the old François de Cuvilliés made a draft for the facade in the style of the rococo with only light changes which were completed by his son François de Cuvilliés the Younger.

The cloister construction was carried out in line with the manuscript of Zuccalli under whose management the master builder Lorenzo Perti created the buildings. Church and cloister formed a large quadrangle.

When the Schwabinger Gate was broken down in 1817 the Theatinerkirche became a major visual point with the construction of the Ludwigstrasse. The facade of the Ludwigskirche with two steeples was later constructed as balance to the Theatinerkirche, which stands diagonally opposite.

History
The Theatines gained a good reputation as pastors and scholars, until the late 18th Century when an increasing decline of religious discipline and the monastery finances became noticeable. Therefore, Elector Max IV Joseph, later King Max I Joseph, closed the monastery on 26 October 1801, i.e., before the secularization. The Theatinerkirche remained Collegiate Church, Court Church, and the convent attracted the remaining three electoral departments (ministries) a (Finance, Justice and Spiritual Affairs). Already in 1799 i.e., before dissolution of the monastery, the Department of Foreign Affairs had moved into the Theatine monastery.

During the Second World War, particularly in the years 1944/45, the church was bombed, and the west wing of the monastery was destroyed. The altarpiece of the foundation of the Theatine Church (Antonio Zanchi, 1675), a donation of the electoral couple, was also destroyed. The restoration began in 1946, and was largely completed by 1955. Since 1954, the Dominicans have ministered at St. Cajetan. The reconstruction of the monastery was completed in 1973. Since 2001, a comprehensive overhaul has been in progress, in which the Theatinerkirche will also get a new sanctuary design.

Organs
The church has three organs: the main organ from 1960/2009, located in the choir behind the altar (49 stops/67 ranks), the antiphonal organ on the right side (across the pulpit), built in 1950 (18 stops/23 ranks; playable from a two-manual console and the five-manual main console), and a positive organ from 2018 (4 stops). Another organ predates both and was built in 1686 when the church was first constructed.

The antiphonal organ was built by Anton Bayr (de) in 1782. The organ, like much of Munich, suffered damage during the Allied bombings of World War II and was rebuilt by local organ builder Carl Schuster in 1950.

Burials
A small chapel contains the tombs of King Maximilian II (reg. 1848-1864) and his consort Queen Marie. The crypt also contains the Prince’s Tomb, where among others these members of the Bavarian Royal Family were buried: 

Princess Henriette Adelaide of Savoy
Ferdinand Maria, Elector of Bavaria, (reg. 1651-1679)
Maximilian II Emanuel, Elector of Bavaria, (reg. 1679-1726)
Charles VII, Holy Roman Emperor, (reg. 1726-1745)
Maximilian III, Elector of Bavaria, (reg. 1745-1777)
Charles Theodore, Elector of Bavaria, (reg. 1777-1799)
 King Maximilian I Joseph of Bavaria, (reg. 1799-1825)
 King Otto of Greece, (reg. 1832-1862)
Luitpold, Prince Regent of Bavaria, (reg. 1886-1912)
Princess Alexandra of Bavaria
Rupprecht, Crown Prince of Bavaria
Duchess Maria Anna Josepha of Bavaria
Duchess Marie Gabrielle in Bavaria
Prince Heinrich of Bavaria

References

External links

Theatinerkirche homepage 
 Photo spread of the Theatine Church / St. Cajetan, Dominican monastery
360° Panorama at the Theatinerkirche
360° interactive Panorama of the interior of Theatinerkirche (Flash)
 https://www.monacodibaviera.org/theatinerkirche/
  Complete list of burials

17th-century Roman Catholic church buildings in Germany
Roman Catholic churches completed in 1690
Baroque architecture in Munich
Roman Catholic churches in Munich
Tourist attractions in Munich
Church buildings with domes
Burial sites of German royal houses
1690 establishments in the Holy Roman Empire
Burial sites of the House of Wittelsbach
Cultural heritage monuments in Munich
Theatine churches